Krzysztof Mieczysław Suprowicz (born 15 October 1953, Warsaw) is a Polish diplomat, ambassador of Poland to Yemen (1996–2002), Moldova (2005–2009) and Qatar (2014–2017).

Life 
Suprowicz graduated from English studies at the University of Bucharest and Arab studies at the University of Warsaw (1980). After his studies, he worked for a year as a lecturer. Between 1981 and 1987, he was sales representative in Baghdad of such companies as Budimex, PHZ Polservice, Le Controle Technique.

In 1991, he began his diplomatic career at the Ministry of Foreign Affairs (MFA). He served as First Secretary at the embassy in Bucharest. Between 1996 and 2002, he was ambassador to Yemen, additionally accredited to Ethiopia, Eritrea, Djibouti. In 2000, he was hijacked by local rebels and released after a couple of days. From 2003 for a couple of months he has been chargé d'affaires at the embassy in Addis Ababa, Ethiopia. In March 2004, he became deputy director of the MFA Africa and the Middle East Department. From 2005 to 2009, he was ambassador to Moldova, from 2014 to 2017 to Qatar.

Besides Polish, he speaks English, Arabic, Romanian, Russian, German, and French. Married, with two daughters.

Honours 

 Order of Honour (Moldova)

References 

1953 births
Ambassadors of Poland to Moldova
Ambassadors of Poland to Qatar
Ambassadors of Poland to Yemen
Living people
Diplomats from Warsaw
Recipients of the Order of Honour (Moldova)
University of Warsaw alumni
University of Bucharest alumni